Natalievca is a commune in Făleşti District, Moldova. It is composed of five villages: Beleuți, Comarovca, Ivanovca, Natalievca, Popovca and Țapoc.

References

Communes of Fălești District